2017 President's Cup may refer to:
 2017 Indonesia President's Cup, football
 2017 President of Ireland's Cup, football
 2017 President's Cup (Maldives), football
 2017 President's Cup (tennis)